Phytophthora europaea is a non-papillate homothallic plant pathogen that mainly infects European oak. It differs from other species of the genus (like P. fragariae) by producing oogonia with tapered bases, irregular walls and exclusively paragynous antheridia. It has also been found in the United States.

References

Further reading

europaea
Water mould plant pathogens and diseases
Tree diseases
Protists described in 2002